Mabeta may refer to:

Places
 Mabeta, Syria a town in Afrin district, Syria.

Persons
 Fudge Mabeta